The five techniques, also known as deep interrogation, are a group of interrogation methods developed by the United Kingdom during the 20th century. Originally developed by British forces in a variety of 20th-century conflicts, they are most notable for being applied to detainees in Northern Ireland during the Troubles. The five collective methods are prolonged wall-standing, hooding, subjection to noise, deprivation of sleep, and deprivation of food and drink. 

They were first used in Northern Ireland in 1971 as part of Operation Demetrius – the mass arrest and internment of people suspected of involvement with the Provisional Irish Republican Army (IRA). Out of those arrested, fourteen were subjected to a programme of "deep interrogation" using the five techniques. This took place at Shackleton Barracks, a secret interrogation centre in Northern Ireland. For seven days, when not being interrogated, the detainees were kept hooded and handcuffed in a cold cell and subjected to a continuous loud hissing noise. Here they were forced to stand in a stress position for many hours and were deprived of sleep, food and drink. They were also repeatedly beaten, and some reported being kicked in the genitals, having their heads banged against walls and being threatened with injections. The effect was prolonged pain, physical and mental exhaustion, severe anxiety, depression, hallucinations, disorientation and repeated loss of consciousness. It also resulted in long-term psychological trauma. The fourteen became known as "the Hooded Men" and were the only detainees in Northern Ireland subjected to all five techniques together. Other detainees were subjected to at least one of the five techniques along with other interrogation methods.

In 1976, the European Commission of Human Rights ruled that the five techniques amounted to torture. The case was then referred to the European Court of Human Rights. In 1978 the court ruled that the techniques were "inhuman and degrading" and breached Article 3 of the European Convention on Human Rights, but did not amount to torture. In 2014, after new information was uncovered that showed the decision to use the five techniques in Northern Ireland in 1971–1972 had been taken by ministers, the Irish Government asked the European Court of Human Rights to review its judgement. In 2018, the Court declined.

The Court's ruling that the five techniques did not amount to torture was later internally cited by the United States to justify its own interrogation methods, which included the five techniques. British agents also taught the five techniques to the forces of Brazil's military dictatorship.

During the Iraq War, the illegal use of the five techniques by British servicemembers contributed to the death of Baha Mousa. In 2021, the Supreme Court of the United Kingdom found that the use of the five techniques amounts to torture.

Parker Report
In response to the public and Parliamentary disquiet on 16 November 1971, the Government commissioned a committee of inquiry chaired by Lord Parker, the Lord Chief Justice of England to look into the legal and moral aspects of the use of the five techniques.

The "Parker Report" was published on 2 March 1972, and had found the five techniques to be illegal under domestic law:

On the same day (2 March 1972), the United Kingdom Prime Minister Edward Heath stated in the House of Commons:

Directives expressly prohibiting the use of the techniques, whether singly or in combination, were then issued to the security forces by the Government. These are still in force and the use of such methods by UK security forces would not be condoned by the Government.

European Commission of Human Rights inquiries and findings

The Irish Government, on behalf of the men who had been subject to the five methods, took a case to the
European Commission on Human Rights. The Commission stated that it
"considered the combined use of the five methods to amount to torture, on the grounds that (1) the intensity of the stress caused by techniques creating sensory deprivation "directly affects the personality physically and mentally"; and (2) "the systematic application of the techniques for the purpose of inducing a person to give information shows a clear resemblance to those methods of systematic torture which have been known over the ages... a modern system of torture falling into the same category as those systems... applied in previous times as a means of obtaining information and confessions".

European Court of Human Rights trial Ireland v. the United Kingdom 

The Commission's findings were appealed. In 1978, in the European Court of Human Rights (ECHR) trial Ireland v. United Kingdom (5310/71) [1978] ECHR 1, the facts were not in dispute and the judges court published the following in their judgement:

These were referred to by the court as the five techniques. The court ruled:

On 8 February 1977, in proceedings before the ECHR, and in line with the findings of the Parker report and United Kingdom Government policy, Samuel Silkin, the Attorney General for England and Wales and Attorney General for Northern Ireland, stated that

Irish Government seek to re-open case
On 2 December 2014, the Minister for Foreign Affairs and Trade, Charles Flanagan announced that the Irish Government had asked European Court of Human Rights to revise its judgment, following evidence uncovered by an RTÉ documentary called The Torture Files.

In 2018, the European Court of Human Rights decided not to revise its judgment, by six votes to one.

See also
 Sensory deprivation
 Use of torture since 1948: United Kingdom

References

Footnotes

Further reading

Article 3 of the European Convention on Human Rights
European Court of Human Rights cases involving the United Kingdom
European Court of Human Rights cases involving Ireland
European Court of Human Rights interstate cases
The Troubles (Northern Ireland)
Imprisonment and detention
 
 

Police misconduct in Northern Ireland
Torture in the United Kingdom
1970s in Northern Ireland
Human rights abuses in the United Kingdom